"I'll Change Your Mind" is a song by Australian singer songwriter Kate Miller-Heidke and released in April 2012 as the lead single from Miller-Heidke's third studio album Nightflight.

Music video
The official music video for "I'll Change Your Mind" premiered on 6 May 2012 on Miller-Heidke's official YouTube channel.

In the video, Miller-Heidke is seen in court with her romantic interest, where she is given a restraining order. At home, Miller-Heidke then packs her car full of her possessions, and drives to her romantic interest's house, and breaks in using a key from under the floor mat, and makes dolls of the two of them out of pillows. She then proceeds to camp outside her interest's house, and when he tries to call the police, he finds his phone line cut. The next morning, he throws out the two pillow dolls and boards up his house. At night, when he is still doing this, Miller-Heidke crawls in through the window, and grabs a knife. Standing in front of her interest, she then stabs herself in her chest, and pulls her heart out, holding it in her hands, literally giving him her heart. The video ends as her interest looks on in horror.

The video for "I'll Change Your Mind" was rated MA 15+ by the Australian Classification Board for strong violence.

The music video was nominated for Best Video at the ARIA Music Awards of 2012.

Track listing
Digital download
 "I'll Change Your Mind" - 3:01

References

2012 songs
2012 singles
Kate Miller-Heidke songs
Songs written by Keir Nuttall
Songs written by Kate Miller-Heidke
Sony BMG singles